El Barrio may refer to:
 The Spanish Harlem neighborhood of Manhattan, New York City
 Parts of East Los Angeles
 Wynwood neighborhood of Miami
 Gulfton neighborhood of Houston
 El Barrio (singer), a Spanish flamenco singer
 "El Barrio", a 2016 synthpop song by Eden xo
 A composition by Joe Henderson from the album Inner Urge